The Chinchilla–Cartagena railway is an Iberian-gauge railway in Spain.

History
The line was completed between 1863 and 1863. In 2003, the Chinchilla train crash occurred on the line, where a passenger train and a freight train collided, killing 19 people and injuring 38.

In 2018, the Alvia 730 service began, enabling travel times between Cartagena to Madrid, via the line to Chinchilla, of three hours and thirty-two minutes.

Route
The line begins as a branch from the Madrid–Valencia railway at Chinchilla and passes through Murcia del Carmen to terminate in Cartagena. In 2019, 26 km of new, more direct track between Cieza and Agramón opened, shortening journey times by 20 minutes.

References

Railway lines in Spain
Railway lines opened in 1863
Iberian gauge railways